"Action" is a self-written and produced 1975 song by British glam rock band Sweet.

Background
The song went through several iterations; a 7" single version was recorded at Ian Gillan's Kingsway Studios in London and slightly different versions appear on the albums Strung Up and Give Us a Wink.The lyrics refer to Sweet's negative treatment as pop stars, particularly by the music press, and to the demands of the music industry. The track features a masked "backwards vocal" with the words "You kiss my arse".

The first verse has a striking resemblance to the hard rock section of Queen's "Bohemian Rhapsody", which was not released for another 4 months. Lead singer Brian Connolly called it a "blatant rip-off".

Chart performance

Weekly charts
The single reached No. 15 in the UK in July 1975, and went to the Top 40 in the US the following year.

Year-end charts

Def Leppard version

In 1993, English rock band  Def Leppard covered it on their album Retro Active. "Andy [Scott] said that our version of 'Action' was the best cover of a Sweet song he'd ever heard," noted singer Joe Elliott. The original 1992 recording, recorded before guitarist Vivian Campbell joined the band, was released as a B-side to "Make Love Like a Man"; the version featured on Retro Active and released as a single features a newly-recorded snare drum from drummer Rick Allen and additional backing vocals from Campbell and P.J. Smith. The single charted at number 14 on UK Singles Charts 

The music video was directed by Phil Tuckett from NFL entertainment. The approximate shooting date was between June and December 1993; in Sheffield, Ottawa, and Joe Elliott's home in Ireland. The band 'discovered' the masked backwards vocal on the original track and refer to it on the CD single cover.

Leppard's version reappeared on a special edition of their 2006 album Yeah!.

Track listing

CD: Bludgeon Riffola/LEPCD 13 (UK)/858 093-2 (INT) 
 "Action"
 "She's Too Tough" (Joe's demo)
 "Miss You in a Heartbeat" (Phil's demo)

Other cover versions
The song was also covered by Raven (on their 1981 album Rock Until You Drop)
Black 'n Blue (on their 1984 album Black 'n Blue)
Power Metal band Vengeance Incorporated on their 1992 album Bad Crazy 
Steve Stevens (on his 1989 album Atomic Playboys). 
Scorpions released it in German translation as "Wenn es richtig losgeht" on the B-side of the single "Fuchs geh' voran" (a translation of "Fox on the Run", also by Sweet). 
Bodybuilder/hard rock singer Jon Mikl Thor once performed the song on The Mike Douglas Show.

References

The Sweet songs
Def Leppard songs
1975 singles
1994 singles
Songs written by Andy Scott (guitarist)
Songs written by Brian Connolly
Songs written by Steve Priest
Songs written by Mick Tucker
1975 songs